Ian Weakly AKA Ian Weakley (born 24 February 1974 in Montego Bay, Saint James Parish) is a retired male hurdler from Jamaica. Weakly's best performance came in 2003 with a time of 48.55 in the 400 meter hurdles, ran in Trikala, Greece.

Pre-Professional 
Weakly began competing in athletics (Track and field) at St. Elizabeth Technical High School. Originally an 800m runner, Weakly transitioned to the 400 meter hurdles and began to succeed. Weakly won both the 1992 CARIFTA Games and 1993 CARIFTA Games in the 400 meter hurdles. After graduation Weakly attended Southwestern Christian College where he won both silver and bronze at the 1994 & 1995 NJCAA National Championships. Also during his time at Southwestern Christian College Weakly qualified for the 1994 Commonwealth Games final where he finished eighth. Weakly then transferred to George Mason University being apart of the 1995 Indoor National Championship winning team. During the following 1996 outdoor season Weakly would win silver and bronze in the 400 metres hurdles and the 4 × 400 metres relay at the NCAA Track and Field Championships as well as place fourth at the Jamaican Athletics Championships just missing out on the 1996 Atlanta Olympic Games. Weakly would then run his fastest 1000 metres and 800 metres within a week of each other in February 1997 clocking in at 2:25.78 and 1:48.42 respectively. Weakly would Graduate from George Mason in 1998 with a Bachelors in International Relations and Government & Politics. Later that year he would sign a professional contract with Nike.

Professional Athletics Career 
Weakly is best known for winning the gold medal in the 400m hurdles at the 2001 Jamaican Athletics Championships. After placing fourth in 1996, Weakly made it to the 2000 Summer Olympics where he reached the semi-finals. In 2002 Weakly would place third at the 2002 Commonwealth Games. Later that year he would place 5th at the IAAF World Cup. In 2003 he would run his lifetime best of 48.55 seconds, in Trikala. This time put Weakly as one of the fastest 150 runners all-time in his event. However, after an impressive 2003 season Weakly was unable to replicate this performance in 2004, where he fell in qualifying for the Olympics. The next year, Weakly recaptured his 2003 form by winning gold in the 2005 IAAF Super Grand Prix in Doha and placing second in the Golden Grand Prix in Osaka, Japan. He would make the 2005 World Athletics Final finishing eighth. Weakly would next win silver at the 2006 Central American and Caribbean Games. After placing 5th at the National Championships and not qualifying for the 2008 Beijeng Olympics, Weakly would retire from professional running.

References

External links

1974 births
Living people
Jamaican male hurdlers
Athletes (track and field) at the 1994 Commonwealth Games
Athletes (track and field) at the 2000 Summer Olympics
Athletes (track and field) at the 2002 Commonwealth Games
Olympic athletes of Jamaica
People from Montego Bay
Commonwealth Games medallists in athletics
Commonwealth Games bronze medallists for Jamaica
Universiade medalists in athletics (track and field)
Goodwill Games medalists in athletics
Universiade silver medalists for Jamaica
Medalists at the 1997 Summer Universiade
Competitors at the 2001 Goodwill Games
Central American and Caribbean Games medalists in athletics
Goodwill Games gold medalists in athletics
Medallists at the 2002 Commonwealth Games